Terpinolene synthase (EC 4.2.3.113, ag9, PmeTPS2, LaLIMS_RR) is an enzyme with systematic name geranyl-diphosphate diphosphate-lyase (cyclizing, terpinolene-forming). This enzyme catalyses the following chemical reaction

 geranyl diphosphate  terpinolene + diphosphate

This enzyme requires Mg2+.

References

External links 
 

EC 4.2.3